The Vésubie is a river in the southeast of France. It is a left tributary of the Var in the Maritime Alps. The source is in the Mercantour National park near the border with Italy. The river flows through the town of Saint-Martin-Vésubie which is a major center for hiking. It flows into the Var near Levens. One of its tributaries is the Gordolasque.

Towns along the river
Saint-Martin-Vésubie
Roquebillière
Lantosque
Utelle
Duranus
Belvédère

References

Rivers of France
Rivers of Alpes-Maritimes
Rivers of Provence-Alpes-Côte d'Azur
Rivers of the Alps